Eupithecia isabellina is a moth in the  family Geometridae. It is found in the high Andes of Ecuador.

References

Moths described in 1993
isabellina
Moths of South America